Harry Taylor (born 12 June 1986) is a former Australian rules footballer who played for the Geelong Football Club in the Australian Football League (AFL).

Early life
Taylor attended Geraldton Grammar School in Geraldton where he was school captain in 2003 before moving to Perth in 2004 to pursue a possible career in the AFL. In 2001 he was the recipient of the Pierre de Coubertin Award and in 2003 he was one of eight Australian students selected to attend the 4th International Youth Forum in Italy. To help prepare himself for life as a footballer, Taylor worked for a year as a bricklayer to try to gain muscle which would ultimately help him as an AFL footballer. He grew up supporting Adelaide, idolising the high flying Tony Modra.

He is a mature age player who spent three seasons, and played 49 games for East Fremantle in the West Australian Football League (WAFL). Taylor finished third in the East Fremantle Sharks best and fairest in 2007. Before being drafted Taylor was studying physiotherapy at university, and had never left his home state of Western Australia.

AFL career

Taylor was considered a surprise selection at pick 17 in the 2007 draft because of his age. Taylor made his debut for the Cats in the first round of the 2008 NAB Cup against Melbourne, in a highly impressive display in defence. He can play at either end of the ground as a key position player, but has made his mark at CHB though he has shown his versatility by kicking three goals in his debut season.

Taylor's football superstition is to wear zinc cream during every game regardless of the weather, however in his first game at Telstra Dome he did not wear it in fear of attracting too much attention. He has been known to take notes on each opponent he plays on in a bid to help improve his game.

In the heritage round clash against Melbourne, Taylor was forced to wear a guernsey with the number 85 on it as opposed to his usual number 7 guernsey. After changing his guernsey twice due to the blood rule, there were no spare number 7 guernseys left and he could not return to the field until he was wearing a clean guernsey. It is still unclear why there was a spare number 85 guernsey.

Taylor made his finals debut in the Qualifying Final against St Kilda.

He credits his outstanding first season to the fact that he has an established backline around him and talented teammates who he can learn from. Former Geelong coach, Mark Thompson, has shown great faith in Taylor, stating that he will be with the Geelong Football Club for a very long time. Taylor's impressive debut season was recognised when he was awarded Geelong's Best first-year player award.

Harry Taylor played a superb role in the grand final, holding Nick Riewoldt to only a single goal. Although Taylor often had a third-man up in contested situations, he still played an excellent match on one of the AFL's best players. Riewoldt took a fine one-on-one mark and diving mark in front of Taylor in the third term, but the Cat hit back with a stunning smother in the third term just as Riewoldt was snapping at goal from the pocket. Taylor also kept the ball alive in the final term on the boundary and took the match-saving mark deep in defence when Darren Milburn kicked out. A superb game from the young defender whom Tom Harley and Matthew Scarlett heaped praises upon. Taylor finished with an equal record 15 spoils and played three-quarters with a broken hand.

Harry Taylor played another key role in Geelong's 2011 Premiership Winning side against Collingwood.  Taylor started the match on Travis Cloke of Collingwood and held him well early, however Cloke soon had a brief "purple patch" of form and booted 3 brilliant goals from outside 50 metres on his natural left boot.  The Geelong coaching box decided to try Tom Lonergan on Cloke, and Cloke didn't manage to kick a goal after that move.  However Harry Taylor still had a marvelous game, taking 4 critical marks in defence stimulating some Trademark Geelong rebounds.  Whilst gathering 10 disposals on the day he was part of the Geelong elite defence who played a pivotal role in cutting off Collingwood's scoring opportunities and setting up play through the Geelong midfield.

This was Taylor's second Premiership Medallion with The Geelong Cats.  It came after a stellar year of defensive work on several of the competitions key forwards.  It is clear that Geelong's defensive players are a close knit unit with a brief sub-group "defenders" photograph on the field of the MCG with the 2011 Premiership Cup.

Harry Taylor retired from the AFL after Geelong's loss to Richmond in the 2020 AFL Grand Final, alongside fellow Geelong veteran Gary Ablett Jnr.

On 1 July 2021, Taylor announced that he would come out of retirement to play for East Fremantle in the WAFL, returning to the club that he played with before being drafted by Geelong. Taylor had previously moved back to Western Australia and was leading the East Fremantle academy program following his AFL retirement, while playing local football for Northampton in the Great Northern Football League.

On 18 October 2021, it was announced that Taylor took up a high performance role working under head of football Simon Lloyd within the Cats’ football operations team.

Personal life
Before being drafted he had never been to Geelong and could not locate it on a map. He is fascinated with World War II which led him to start drinking Cognac and to start watching WWII-inspired TV series, Band of Brothers, which he sometimes watches before a game to draw inspiration from. Taylor dislikes metropolitan life, as there are "too many people up there" for his liking. Taylor's high school sweetheart, Michelle Giudice, gave birth to a little boy named James Taylor on 2 June 2010. Tradition has been broken in the Taylor family, after naming the baby boy James, instead of a fourth generation of Harrys.

As of 2020, Taylor was studying a Bachelor of Applied Management course.

Statistics

|-
|- style="background-color: #EAEAEA"
! scope="row" style="text-align:center" | 2008
|style="text-align:center;"|
| 7 || 21 || 3 || 0 || 157 || 170 || 327 || 96 || 28 || 0.1 || 0.0 || 7.5 || 8.1 || 15.6 || 4.6 || 1.3 || 0
|-
! scope="row" style="text-align:center" | 2009
|style="text-align:center;"|
| 7 || 22 || 3 || 2 || 152 || 235 || 387 || 121 || 28 || 0.1 || 0.1 || 6.9 || 10.7 || 17.6 || 5.5 || 1.3 || 1
|- style="background-color: #EAEAEA"
! scope="row" style="text-align:center" | 2010
|style="text-align:center;"|
| 7 || 23 || 2 || 3 || 191 || 197 || 388 || 159 || 35 || 0.1 || 0.1 || 8.3 || 8.6 || 16.9 || 6.9 || 1.5 || 3
|-
! scope="row" style="text-align:center" | 2011
|style="text-align:center;"|
| 7 || 24 || 0 || 2 || 208 || 148 || 356 || 144 || 46 || 0.0 || 0.1 || 8.7 || 6.2 || 14.8 || 6.0 || 1.9 || 0
|- style="background-color: #EAEAEA"
! scope="row" style="text-align:center" | 2012
|style="text-align:center;"|
| 7 || 22 || 15 || 5 || 205 || 152 || 357 || 135 || 48 || 0.7 || 0.2 || 9.3 || 6.9 || 16.2 || 6.1 || 2.2 || 7
|-
! scope="row" style="text-align:center" | 2013
|style="text-align:center;"|
| 7 || 24 || 15 || 9 || 266 || 135 || 401 || 176 || 36 || 0.6 || 0.4 || 11.1 || 5.6 || 16.7 || 7.3 || 1.5 || 10
|- style="background-color: #EAEAEA"
! scope="row" style="text-align:center" | 2014
|style="text-align:center;"|
| 7 || 23 || 2 || 3 || 213 || 139 || 352 || 149 || 47 || 0.1 || 0.1 || 9.3 || 6.0 || 15.3 || 6.5 || 2.0 || 7
|-
! scope="row" style="text-align:center" | 2015
|style="text-align:center;"|
| 7 || 21 || 1 || 3 || 207 || 161 || 368 || 159 || 39 || 0.0 || 0.1 || 9.9 || 7.7 || 17.6 || 6.6 || 1.9 || 6
|- style="background-color: #EAEAEA"
! scope="row" style="text-align:center" | 2016
|style="text-align:center;"|
| 7 || 24 || 4 || 1 || 203 || 148 || 351 || 152 || 41 || 0.2 || 0.0 || 8.5 || 6.2 || 14.6 || 6.3 || 1.7 || 2
|-
! scope="row" style="text-align:center" | 2017
|style="text-align:center;"|
| 7 || 25 || 22 || 15 || 182 || 169 || 351 || 133 || 59 || 0.9 || 0.6 || 7.3 || 6.8 || 14.0 || 5.3 || 2.4 || 4
|- style="background-color: #EAEAEA"
! scope="row" style="text-align:center" | 2018
|style="text-align:center;"|
| 7 || 8 || 4 || 4 || 58 || 39 || 97 || 30 || 12 || 0.5 || 0.5 || 7.3 || 4.9 || 12.1 || 3.8 || 1.5 || 0
|-
! scope="row" style="text-align:center" | 2019
|style="text-align:center;"|
| 7 || 24 || 3 || 2 || 186 || 145 || 331 || 114 || 40 || 0.1 || 0.1 || 7.8 || 6.0 || 13.8 || 4.8 || 1.7 || 0
|- style="background-color: #EAEAEA"
! scope="row" style="text-align:center" | 2020
|style="text-align:center;"|
| 7 || 19 || 1 || 0 || 113 || 73 || 186 || 61 || 27 || 0.1 || 0.0 || 5.9 || 3.8 || 9.8 || 3.2 || 1.4 || 0
|- class="sortbottom"
! colspan=3| Career
! 280
! 75
! 49
! 2341
! 1911
! 4252
! 1629
! 486
! 0.3
! 0.2
! 8.4
! 6.8
! 15.2
! 5.8
! 1.7
! 40
|}

Notes

Honours and achievements
Team
 AFL Premiership (2009, 2011)
 AFL Pre-Season Premiership (2009)
 McClelland Trophy (2008, 2019)

Individual
 All-Australian team (2010, 2013)
 Geelong F.C. Best First Year Player Award (2008)
 Australian international rules honours (2014, 2015)
 Jim Stynes Medallist (2015)

References

External links

Harry Taylor's statistics at WAFL Online

1986 births
All-Australians (AFL)
Australian rules footballers from Western Australia
East Fremantle Football Club players
Geelong Football Club players
Geelong Football Club Premiership players
Living people
People from Northampton, Western Australia
Australia international rules football team players
Two-time VFL/AFL Premiership players